Departure from the Northern Wasteland is the debut studio album of electronic music composer Michael Hoenig, released in 1978 by Warner Bros. Records.

Track listing

Personnel
Adapted from the Departure from the Northern Wasteland liner notes.

Musicians
 Michael Duwe – keyboards (B3)
 Michael Hoenig – instruments, production, mixing, recording
 Uschi Obermaier – voice (A)
 Lutz Ulbrich – double guitar (A)

Production and additional personnel
 Arnie Acosta – mastering
 John Cabalka – art direction
 Dennis G. Hendricks – illustrations
 Jutta Henglein – photography
 Dave Hutchins – mixing
 Conny Plank – mixing

Release history

References

External links 
 

1978 debut albums
Warner Records albums
Kuckuck Schallplatten albums